Jadranski naftovod (JANAF) is a crude oil transportation company in Croatia. It operates the JANAF oil transport system, a part of the Adria oil pipeline.

JANAF operates oil terminal of the Port of Rijeka in Omišalj on the Krk Island. In 2020, the Port of Rijeka Liquid Cargo Terminal transported 8.1 million tonnes of oil, what is an increase of 22% compared to 6.6 million tonnes transported in 2019. In 2020, JANAF recorded annual revenue of 790 million kuna (104.9 million euro), what is 10.6% more than 2019, and annual net profit of 288.1 million kuna (38.2 million euro). This was JANAF's best business results since its establishment. JANAF is a joint stock company owned by Croatian Pension Insurance Institute (37.26%), Restructuring and Sales Center (26.28%), the Republic of Croatia (14.97%), INA (11.80%), HEP (5.36%) and other shareholders owning less than 5% of stock each. JANAF had 382 employees working in Omišalj terminal and other JANAF facilities in Croatia.

References 

Oil and gas companies of Croatia
Companies listed on the Zagreb Stock Exchange
Oil pipeline companies
Companies based in Zagreb
Government-owned companies of Croatia